Shattered EP is an EP by Orthodox Jewish reggae singer Matisyahu.

Track listing
"Smash Lies" – 3:24
"So Hi So Lo" – 3:41
"Two Child One Drop" – 6:02
"I Will Be Light" – 3:35

Charts

References

Matisyahu albums
2008 debut EPs